Patricia Ann Deveaux (born 1968) is a Bahamian Progressive Liberal Party politician serving as Speaker of the House of Assembly and the Member of Parliament (MP) for Bamboo Town. She is the second woman to hold the position of Speaker after Italia Johnson.

Career 
Deveuax served as a Senior Executive Secretary in the Ministry of National Security for 30 years. She also served as National Vice-Chairman of the Progressive Liberal Party, PLP Chairman of the Kennedy constituency and PLP Chairman of Bamboo Town constituency.

Parliament 
Patricia Deveaux was elected to parliament in 2021 from the Bamboo Town constituency defeating incumbent Free National Movement incumbent Renward Wells. She, along with 6 others, make up the largest number of women to ever be seated as members of parliament in the Bahamas. Deveaux was elected the second woman Speaker of the House of Assembly.

References

External links
PLP Profile

Living people
21st-century Bahamian women politicians
21st-century Bahamian politicians
Women legislative speakers
Speakers of the House of Assembly of the Bahamas
1968 births
Progressive Liberal Party politicians